Lemyra sincera is a moth of the family Erebidae. It was described by Cheng-Lai Fang in 1993. It is found in Yunnan, China.

References

 

sincera
Moths described in 1993